Deh Sorkh (also Romanized as Deh-e Sorkh; also known as Deh Surkh) is a village in Nurabad Rural District, Garkan-e Jonubi District, Mobarakeh County, Isfahan Province, Iran. At the 2006 census, its population was 3,582, in 873 families.

References 

Populated places in Mobarakeh County